The Mid-Atlantic Bight is a coastal region running from Massachusetts to North Carolina. It contains the New York Bight. It is separated from the South Atlantic Bight by Cape Hatteras to the south and the Gulf of Maine to the north by Cape Cod.

References

External links
The Mid-Atlantic Bight (MAB) National Undersea Research Center

Landforms of Massachusetts
Landforms of New York (state)
Landforms of New Jersey
Landforms of North Carolina
Landforms of the Atlantic Ocean
Bights (geography)